Heidi Marie Schellman (born 1957) is an American particle physicist at Oregon State University (OSU), where she heads the Department of Physics. She is an expert in Quantum chromodynamics.

Early life and education
Schellman was born in 1957 in Hennepin, Minnesota, the daughter of two chemists. Her father, John Anthony Schellman, who trained at Princeton, was a professor of chemistry and biochemistry at the University of Oregon; he was an early member of the "groundbreaking Institute of Molecular Biology" and a member of the National Academy of Sciences. Her mother, F. Charlotte Green, held a Ph.D. in chemistry from Stanford and had also worked at the California Institute of Technology. They married in 1954 while they were both postdoctoral fellows at the Carlsberg Laboratory in Copenhagen, Denmark. At the University of Oregon, both her parents "were known for advancing the study of protein structure, folding and stability through techniques such as circular dichroism spectroscopy".

Heidi Schellman graduated from South Eugene High School in Eugene, Oregon, in 1975. She earned a B.S. in mathematics in 1977 from Stanford University and an M.S. and Ph.D. in physics by 1984 from the University of California, Berkeley.

Shellman married physicist Stephen A. Wolbers in 1983.

Career and research 
Shellman began her career as a programmer at the Stanford Linear Accelerator (SLAC), where she learned "she liked the mixture of theory and practice in experimental physics. She describes her love of physics succinctly: 'Physicists get to build things!' ".

Prior to joining the OSU faculty in 2015, she held postdoctoral fellowships at the University of Chicago and Fermilab, and was on the faculty of Northwestern University, where she was chair of the physics and astronomy programs at the Weinberg College of Arts and Sciences.

In 2015, Schellman was elected vice chair of the Commission on Particles and Fields within the International Union of Pure and Applied Physics.

Schellman's research interests include, "future high-intensity neutrino experiments and the relation between cosmology and high-energy physics". She has collaborated on D-Zero and Tevatron experiments at Fermilab, researching the mass of top quarks and interactions of protons and anti-protons, and has extensively studied quantum chromodynamics perturbation theory.

Honors 
Schellman was an A.P. Sloan Research Fellow and a Department of Energy Outstanding Junior Investigator. She was elected a Fellow of the American Physical Society in 1999, cited for "her leadership in QCD physics and as spokesperson of E-665, the Tevatron muon scattering experiment". She was awarded the 2015 Mentoring Award by the American Physical Society’s Division of Particles and Fields.

References

External links 
 Physicists hunt for hidden particles: NPR, October 13, 2009. (audio, 12:28 minutes)
 Heidi Schellman, From a Physicist's Mind, Helix, Northwestern University, November 30, 2008.

1957 births
Living people
21st-century American physicists
Oregon State University faculty
Particle physicists
Sloan Research Fellows
Stanford University alumni
University of California, Berkeley alumni
American women physicists
People from Hennepin County, Minnesota
Fellows of the American Physical Society
American women academics
21st-century American women scientists